The 2019–20 West Region Premiership was the second and final season of the West Region Premiership the top tier of league competition for SJFA West Region member clubs, and the 18th season since the West Region began in 2002. It was the second season after the reconstruction of the West Region into four regionwide divisions.

As a result of the COVID-19 pandemic, the league was indefinitely suspended on 13 March 2020. The season was officially cancelled on 10 April 2020 following a decision made by the West Region Management Committee, due to the uncertainty surrounding the pandemic and the Scottish Football Association's decision to extend the football shutdown until at least 10 June 2020. Defending champions Auchinleck Talbot were controversially awarded the title on 22 April 2020 on a 'points per game' metric despite sitting third in the table when the season was abandoned.

In April 2020, after prolonged negotiations, all clubs in membership of the West Region applied to join the newly formed West of Scotland Football League.

Teams

Auchinleck Talbot were the defending champions.

Cambuslang Rangers, Petershill and Renfrew were relegated from the 2018–19 Premiership. They were replaced by Benburb, Rossvale and Rutherglen Glencairn who were promoted from the 2018–19 SJFA West Region Championship.

Stadia and locations

Notes

League table

Results

References

External links

7
SJFA West Region Premiership seasons
Scotland